Marion Marshall (June 8, 1929 – September 24, 2018) was an American actress.

Career 
Marshall's first film appearances were in the 20th Century Fox films Gentleman's Agreement and Daisy Kenyon in 1947 (although they were both uncredited).  She went on to play roles (many minor) in over 25 more films until 1967.

Marshall had a small but significant role in I Was a Male War Bride (1949) as the best friend of Ann Sheridan's leading character. She was featured prominently in three Martin and Lewis comedy films, The Stooge, Sailor Beware and That's My Boy, with stars Dean Martin and Jerry Lewis. Among her television appearances, she guest starred twice on Perry Mason in 1959. She played murderer Irene Bedford in "The Case of the Shattered Dream," and title character Ginny Hobart in "The Case of the Spurious Sister".

Personal life 
Marshall married three times, her first husband being the cameraman Allen Davey. In 1950 she was engaged to director Howard Hawks, but a wedding never took place. Her second husband (from May 20, 1952, until 1959) was director Stanley Donen, with whom she had two sons, Peter and Joshua.

On July 21, 1963, in New York City, she married actor Robert Wagner following a 20-month engagement. They had one daughter, Katie, before divorcing in 1971.

Marshall died on September 24, 2018, at a retirement community in Missoula, Montana, at the age of 89.

Filmography 

Daisy Kenyon (1947) (uncredited) as Law Office Telephone Operator
You Were Meant for Me (1948) (uncredited) Bit Part
Sitting Pretty (1948) (uncredited) as Secretary
The Street with No Name (1948) (uncredited) as Singer
The Luck of the Irish (1948) (uncredited) as Secretary
Road House (1948) (uncredited) as Millie
Apartment for Peggy (1948) as Ruth
The Snake Pit (1948) (uncredited) as Young Girl
Unfaithfully Yours (1948) (uncredited) as Maisie, Second Telephone Operator
When My Baby Smiles at Me (1948) (uncredited) as Chorus Girl
I Was a Male War Bride (1949) as Lt. Kitty Lawrence
Dancing in the Dark (1949) (uncredited) as Myrna
Wabash Avenue (1950) (uncredited) as Chorus Girl
A Ticket to Tomahawk (1950) (uncredited) as Annie
Love That Brute (1950) (uncredited) as Dawn O'Day
Stella (1950) as Mary
My Blue Heaven (1950) (uncredited) as Bit Role
Halls of Montezuma (1950) (uncredited) as Nurse
I Can Get It for You Wholesale (1951) (uncredited) as Terry
That's My Boy (1951) as Terry Howard
Sailor Beware (1952) as Hilda Jones
The Stooge (1952) as Genevieve 'Frecklehead' Tait
Peter Gunn as Joanna Lund (1 episode, 1958)
I Want to Live! (1958) (uncredited) as Rita
Schlitz Playhouse of Stars as Belle (1 episode, 1958)
Perry Mason as Irene Bedford (1 episode, 1958)
Have Gun – Will Travel as Maggie O'Bannion (1 episode, 1959)
Perry Mason as Ginny Hobart / (2 episodes, 1959)
Westinghouse Desilu Playhouse as Ronnie Portman (1 episode, 1960)
Via Margutta (1963) as Grace
Gunn (1967) (as M.T. Marshall) as Daisy Jane
It Takes a Thief as Myrna (1 episode, 1968)
Six Days of Justice as Magistrate (1 episode, 1975)

References

Further reading

External links 
 
 
 

1929 births
2018 deaths
20th Century Studios contract players
American film actresses
American television actresses